Joseph Wilson Lowry (1803–1879) was a British engraver.

He was the son of Wilson Lowry and his second wife Rebecca Delvalle and was born on 7 October 1803. His mother's sister, Abigail, was mother of the economist David Ricardo. He was trained by his father and from both parents inherited a taste for science and mathematics; in his work  he specialised in scientific subjects. He died, unmarried, at his residence, 39 Robert Street, Hampstead Road, London, on 15 June 1879.

He engraved plates for the Encyclopædia Metropolitana and for Sir John Rennie a series of drawings for London Bridge. Other work included John Phillips's Geology of Yorkshire, 1835 and Scott Russell's Naval Architecture, 1865, John Weale's 'Scientific Series' and the journals of the Institution of Naval Architects and the Royal Geographical Society. He later was appointed engraver to the Geological Survey of Great Britain and Ireland, as can be seen on their Horizontal   and Vertical  Sections.

References

External Links
 Engravings of paintings for Fisher's Drawing Room Scrap Books, each with a poetical illustration by Letitia Elizabeth Landon:
1832:  by Thomas Allom.
1835:  by Thomas Allom.

1803 births
1879 deaths
English engravers
British Geological Survey